Evvarikee Cheppoddu is a 2019 Indian Telugu-language romantic drama film directed by Basava Shankar. The film stars Rakesh Varre (in his lead debut) and newcomer Gargeyi Yellapragada. The film was released to positive reviews.

Cast 
Rakesh Varre as Hari
Gargeyi Yellapragada as Harathi
Vamsi Raj Nekkanti as Harathi's father

Production 
Basava Shankar, who worked as an assistant director for Run Raja Run and Pelli Choopulu, made his directorial debut with this film.

Soundtrack 
Music by Shankar Sharma and lyrics by Vasu Valaboju.
"Reppakuda Veyaniva" - Divya S. Menon
"Idi Chakkani Vela" -  Sanoop Kalarikkal, Anju Joseph 
"Ayyo Ayyayyo" - Mano
"Avuna Nijamena" - KS Harisankar and Shashaa Tirupati

Reception 
A critic from The Times of India gave the film a rating of three out of five stars and opined that "Evvarikee Cheppoddu is like a surprising, breath of fresh air in midst of all the mass masala. Debutant Basava Shankar selected a script that tells the same ol’ tale. But the way he handles it, exploring something like caste feeling with a humorous touch is what sets him apart". A critic from 123telugu said that "On the whole, Evvarikee Cheppoddu is a message-oriented love story that impresses in bits and pieces. The chemistry between the lead pair and a few romantic scenes related to them are showcased well".

Home media 
The film is available to stream on Netflix.

References